Henri Lucien Guérin (27 August 1921 – 2 April 1995) was a French football player. who played as a defender, and a manager. He coached the France national team at the 1966 FIFA World Cup.

Honours
Orders
Chevalier of the Légion d'honneur: 1992

References

External links
 
 

1921 births
1995 deaths
French footballers
France international footballers
Association football defenders
Stade Rennais F.C. players
Stade Français (association football) players
French football managers
France national football team managers
1966 FIFA World Cup managers
Stade Rennais F.C. managers
AS Saint-Étienne managers
Pays d'Aix FC players
Chevaliers of the Légion d'honneur